Chosea Springs, also known as Chosa, Joseph Springs, Hannatown, Hickory Springs, or Hickory Town, is an unincorporated community in Calhoun County, Alabama, United States.

A post office called Chosa was established in 1889, and remained in operation until it was discontinued later that year.

References

Unincorporated communities in Calhoun County, Alabama
Unincorporated communities in Alabama